Mar Baselios Institute of Technology (MBIT) was established by the Syro-Malankara Catholic Educational Society of the Major Archdiocese of Trivandrum. Moran Mor Baselios Cleemis is its patron.

The institute is situated at the heart of Anchal Town adjacent to the St. John's College campus. The St.Joseph's Hospital and Nursing College and St.John's Central School are other landmarks in the neighborhood.

Having been approved by AICTE it is affiliated to the University of Kerala.

Sources 
Syro-Malnkara Catholic Directory 2006

References

Syro-Malankara Catholic Church
Engineering colleges in Kollam district
Colleges affiliated to the University of Kerala
Catholic universities and colleges in India